Scott Halberstadt (born August 17, 1976) is an American data analyst and former actor. He is best known for playing roles in multiple Nickelodeon shows, most notably as Eric on Drake & Josh, and was typically typecast into a "nerdy" role in his film, television, and advertising credits. According to Scott, his acting career ended in 2010 after his son was born.

Early life and career
Halberstadt was born in Connersville, Indiana, to Fred and Gayle Halberstadt (nee Mikesell). He graduated from Connersville High School and attended Ball State University, studying theatre.

Film
Halberstadt's first acting credit is as "Jared" in the 2002 paintball film In Your Face. His next film role was in the 2006 picture Grandma's Boy, where he played a tester who challenges Jeff (Nick Swardson) to a game of Dance Dance Revolution. Widely unknown, that year he also was credited as a pimply casino employee in Smokin' Aces.

Television
Halberstadt had a recurring role as Eric on the Nickelodeon series Drake & Josh from 2004 to 2007. His other television credits include minor roles in episodes of All That (2000, 2004), The Guardian (2003), Half & Half (2004), The Suite Life of Zack & Cody (2006) and others. He made a cameo appearance in iCarly'''s "iStart a Fan War", playing Eric (from the Drake & Josh series), alongside Alec Medlock and Jake Farrow, who also made cameos as their related Drake and Josh'' characters.

Advertising
Halberstadt appeared in some number of Alltel Wireless television commercials representing the rival AT&T/Cingular Wireless company, as well as seen in commercial spots for Capital One credit cards. Halberstadt also starred in an advert for Fry's Electronics. Consisting of a robot girlfriend getting updates from her boyfriend, played by Scott.

Personal life
Halberstadt is married and has one son born in 2010, as well as a daughter born in 2014. Since 2012, his career has been mostly in data analysis, business intelligence, and management. He currently lives in Chicago and has worked at the IT services firm DI Squared since 2019.

References

External links

Fry's Electronics "Robot Girlfriend" commercial at YouTube
Scott Halberstadt on LinkedIn

1976 births
Living people
21st-century American male actors
Male actors from Indiana
American male film actors
American male television actors
Data scientists
Nickelodeon people
Ball State University alumni
People from Connersville, Indiana
People from Chicago